Matheus Neris Graça (born 12 February 1999) is a Brazilian footballer who currently plays as a midfielder.

Career statistics

Club

Notes

References

1999 births
Living people
Brazilian footballers
Association football midfielders
Campeonato Brasileiro Série B players
São Paulo FC players
Sociedade Esportiva Palmeiras players
Londrina Esporte Clube players
Associação Atlética Internacional (Limeira) players
Figueirense FC players
Cruzeiro Esporte Clube players
People from Osasco
Footballers from São Paulo (state)